Eltro was an American indie rock band from Philadelphia, founded in 1995. The group released three albums for Absolutely Kosher Records in the late 1990s and early 2000s.

Members
Diana Prescott - vocals, bass, guitar, comb, found sound
Jorge Sandrini - guitars, bass, MPC2000, vocals
Rick Henderson - keyboards, trumpet, vocals, harmonica
Ted Johnson - drums, percussion, vocals

Discography
Information Changer (Miner Street, 1998; Absolutely Kosher, 2001)
Velodrome (Absolutely Kosher, 2001)
Past and Present Futurists (Absolutely Kosher, 2003)

References

Musical groups from Pennsylvania